Nikolai Fedorovich Kozlovsky (1921–1996) was a Ukrainian Soviet photographer and teacher.

Biography 
Nikolai Fedorovich Kozlovsky was born May 8, 1921 in Sumy, now in Ukraine.

Career 
In 1937 and 1938, while still in his teens, Kozlovsky photographed at ‘Artek’ children’s ‘pioneer’ camp  on the southern coast of the Crimea in the village of Gurzuf, a "treatment camp" for children with tuberculosis, diseases of the nervous system, overfatigue and anemia, which by the beginning of the 1930s, had been made a year-round facility.  Kozlovsky’s photographs show the children, sometimes dressed in sailor’s uniform, sunbathing, playing snooker, sightseeing and sounding the bugle.

His first serious photo piece was titled "Ukrainian Nuremberg", depicting a trial of Nazis that took place in Kiev's Maidan Nezalezhnosti in January 1946.

Magazine photographer 
In 1948 he joined the magazine Ogonek in Ukraine as a special photo correspondent, remaining with the magazine for nearly forty years. Many of his photographs are in colour and are in an heroic socialist realist style depicting such scenes as father and son washing their Volga car before going to Stalino [Donetsk], a family of 'Heroes of Socialist Labor' enjoying an al fresco meal in their collective farm in Bedia, Georgia, and tourism in the Carpathians. For the magazine he made portraits of Ukrainian and Soviet personalities Buchma A., M. Krushelnitsky, N. Uzhviy, E. Ponomarenko, Y. Shumsky, N. Romanov, M. Litvinenko-Wohlgemuth, I. Patorzhinskogo, Jura, Z. Gaidai, N. Grishko. He was a prolific photographer of the city of Kiev, recording images which are now a valuable historic record.

Kozlovsky was a teacher of photography, one of his students being the noted Yuri Buslenko (1951–2014).

International recognition 
In 1955 Edward Steichen selected Kozlovsky's picture of traditional dancers, discovered by assistant Wayne Miller at the Sovfoto agency, for the ‘Ring a Ring o' Roses’ section of the world touring Museum of Modern Art exhibition The Family of Man, seen by 9 million visitors, and its catalogue, which is still in print. Kozlovsky's photography also featured in a 1984 edition of the magazine Soviet Life distributed in the United States

Kozlovsky's many illustrated books were widely distributed and his prodigious output was recognised in 1986 when he was winner of the Shevchenko Prize for his book "Kiev".

The photographer features in Anatoliĭ Sofronov's novel Meetings with Sholokhov

He died on August 15, 1996 in his beloved Kiev.

Publications 

Among his creative works are more than 30 photography books, including:

 1956 «Peyzazhi Zakarpat'ya» ("Landscapes of Transcarpathia”)
 1959 «Po Zakarpat'yu» (“In Transcarpathia”)
 1960 «Snova tsvetut kashtany» ("The chestnuts are again in bloom”) with Dmitri Baltermants and Oles Honchar
 1961 «V bratskoy Bolgarii» ("In fraternal Bulgaria”)
 1962 «V ob"yektive Yaponiya» (“Japan in the Lens”) circulation 12000.
 1962 «Cherez 15 morey i 2 okeana» (“Through 15 Seas and 2 Oceans”) circulation 20000.
 1968 «Desna — krasunya» ("Desna the Beautiful”) Nikolay Kozlovskiy (photography),Oleg Shmelev (text)
 1969 «Tam gde rozhdayetsya utro» (“Where the Morning Is Born”) with Henry Gurkov. Moscow: Pravda
 1967 «Karpaty zovut» (“The Carpathians call.”) Kiev: Mystetstvo
 1967 «Kiyev i kiyevlyane» ("Kiev and the Kievites”) Kiev: Mystetstvo
 1969 «U nas na Kamchatke» (“Our Kamchatka”) Soviet Russia.
 1973 «V ob"yektive zhizn'» (“Life in the Lens”)  Kiev: Mystetstvo
 1976 «Kiêve míy» (“My Kiev”) Kiev: Mystetstvo. Circulation: 40000
 1979 «Kiyev i kiyevlyane» ("Kiev and the people of Kiev”) Kiev: Mystetstvo
 1981 «Vysokiye paralleli» (“Sublime parallel”) N.Kozlovskiy, L.Ustinov, V.Chin-Mo Tsaya. Circulation 15000
 1982 «Balet» (“Ballet”) Kiev: Mystetstvo
 1982«Fotografii» (“Photographs”) Moscow: The Planet, 1982. 28x26 cm. - 20,000 copies
 1984 «Patonovtsy» On the 50th anniversary of the Institute of Electric Welding. Patona. Kiev: Science. 5000 copies
 1985 «Po Dnepru. (“On the Dnieper”) Kiev: Mystetstvo
 1986 «Kiêve míy» (“This is Kiev”) Kiev: Mystetstvo
 1987 «Kií̈v» (“Kiev”) Kiev: "Mystetstvo", 1987. Circulation 25000 copies. Printed in Yugoslavia, Belgrade
 1987 «Patonovtsy»  2nd ed., Revised. and expanded. - Kiev: Science,  6700 copies
 1993 «Kiyev» (“Kiev”). 2nd ed. Kiev: Mystetstvo"

Awards and Prizes 
 Honoured Cultural Worker USSR
 The State Prize named for TG Shevchenko (1986) for the photo album "My Kiev"
 Order of the Badge of Honour
 Y. A. Galan Prize

References 

Soviet photographers
1921 births
1996 deaths
Ukrainian photographers